The Ministry of Sports and Youth Affairs (MOSYA) administers Myanma sports and youth affairs. The ministry was formed in 1996 as Ministry of Sports and organized as Ministry of Health and Sports in 2016. In 2021, following the formation of caretaker government, the ministry was reorganized as Ministry of Sports and Youth Affairs. The current union minister is Min Thein Zan, appointed by SAC Chairman Min Aung Hlaing.

The Department of Sports and Physical Education, Department of Youth Affairs and their branches are under the Ministry of Sports and Youth Affairs. Other afflications are Myanmar National Olympic Council, National Olympic Committee and Sports Federations. The  Union Minister must be the chairman of National Olympic Committee. The Ministry is also responsible for stadiums in Myanmar.

History
From the early 20 Century to 1941, there are "Burma Athletic Association" in Yangon and "Upper Burma Athletic Association " in Mandalay for sports affairs. In 1936, an athlete, U Zaw Weit, and a coach,U Shein, competed in  Berlin Olympic as British Burma.

On 26 November 1946, Burma organized "Burma Olympic Association" which was governed by General Aung San and Sir Hubert Rance as chairperson and Sir J A Maung Gyi and U Razak  as president and vice-president. On 9 July 1947, they joined with International Olympic Committee and competed in the 1948 London Olympics as "Burma".

On 9 October 1950, the "National Fitness Council" was organized. The Council was composed with a chairman (health minister) and 15 members. In 1952, the State Football matches were held. The 1952 Southeast Asian Boxing Games and 1961 SEAP Games were also held.

On 27 May 1964, the "Burma Sports and Physical Education Committee" was organized. The health minister served as chairman and the director general for SPEC Office served as secretary. In 1972, it was organized as "Sports and Physical Education Department" (DSPE) under the Ministry of Health. On 1 July 1993, it moved under the Ministry of Prime Minister Office.

On 18 December 1996, the government established the "Ministry of Sports" for the country's sports affairs. The DSPE was moved from Ministey of Prime Minister Office to Ministry of Sports.  From 1996 to 2011, SPDC appointed Brigadier Generals of Tatmadaw as Minister of Sports. On March 30 2011, newly elected president Thein Sein appointed Tint Hsan, a businessman, as Union Minister for Sports.

When Htin Kyaw became the president in March 2016, he reduced the number of ministries in his cabinet. He dissolved Ministry of Sports and moved the department of Sports and Physical Education to the Ministry of Health. But on 25 May 2016, the Ministry of Health was renamed as the Ministry of Health and Sports. Prior to 2018, only the Director General of DSPE took the lead in sports sector. In 2018, former badminton player, Mya Lay Sein, was appointed as deputy minister by Win Myint and acted more effectively on behalf of the Union Minister.

After the 2021 coup d'état, Myint Htwe resigned from his post and Mya Lay Sein was suspended by Min Aung Hlaing. They were replaced by Thet Khaing Win, former permanent Secretary of MOHS under Myint Htwe, and Myo Hlaing, former Director General of DSPE. On 1 August 2021, the management committee of SAC was organized as caretaker government and they reconstituted the Ministry of Health and Sports as the Ministry of Health and the Ministry of Sports and Youth Affairs.

List of Ministers

Ministers (1996 - 2011)

Union Ministers (2011 - incumbent)

Deputy Ministers

Departments
Union Minister Office
Department of Sports and Physical Education
Department of Youth Affairs

See also
 Cabinet of Burma
 Ministry of Health and Sports (Myanmar)
 2015 Myanmar National Sports Festival

References

External links
 Official website

SportsandYouthAffairs
Myanmar
Myanmar
Ministries established in 1996
Ministries established in 2021
2021 establishments in Myanmar
1996 establishments in Myanmar